MarkWest Energy Partners, L.P., a subsidiary of MPLX LP, is a natural gas gathering, processing and transportation company master limited partnership of the United States. In 1988, the company was founded in Denver, Colorado and grew to be Colorado's 13th largest company. In 2015 it was acquired by MPLX, itself a subsidiary of Marathon Petroleum.

References

External links
 

Natural gas companies of the United States
Natural gas pipeline companies
Oil companies of the United States
Companies based in Denver
Energy companies established in 1988
Non-renewable resource companies established in 1988
Companies listed on the New York Stock Exchange